Parowan Creek, is a stream in the Parowan Valley of Iron County, Utah.

History
Parowan Creek was originally known by the early travelers on the Mormon Road as the 3rd Creek in the Little Salt Lake Valley, now known as the Parowan Valley, as one traveled southward in the valley. It was a camping spot on the road described in the 1851 Mormon Waybill as having: "...good feed, and wood."

See also
List of rivers of Utah

References

Rivers of Utah
Rivers of Iron County, Utah
Mormon Road